Joshua Klein (born 1974 in Seattle, Washington) is a technologist who uses systems thinking to create alternative methods of succeeding in divergent fields. He is most widely known for his project designed to train crows to fetch lost change, but has also used this method to write three books (a science fiction novel and two business books), participate in several startups, work for the US Intelligence Community, and speak at conferences such as Davos and TED.

Currently, Klein works advising senior executives on technology strategy and is acting CEO of www.indigometrics.com, a culture measurement and management analytics company.

Television

Klein's first television series, The Link, premiered on The National Geographic Channel on Friday May 25, 2012. The show is about the history of human innovation, tracing the connections between the world's greatest inventions in art, science, medicine, finance and more, from ancient times up to the present day. Each episode spans a dozen or so technologies, and traces how each one was dependent on the capabilities provided by the one before it. It is a modern version of James Burke's documentary television series, Connections.

After that, Klein hosted a short series call Smart China, debuting on Discovery Channel Saturday September 3, 2016. The show is about world changing innovations created across China and their implications for improving the environment, cities, travel, and more.

Klein also co-produced the series Game Vision, for Discovery Channel, which debuted on Saturday September 16, 2017. The series is focused on how games have evolved throughout history and are likely to evolve into the future, with an emphasis on sociocultural impact, technology, and the ways that games bleed over into our everyday lives. Game Vision is the first game-related documentary on Discovery since its establishment in 1985.

Books

Klein's first book, a cyberpunk novel called Roo'd, was released in 2007 under a Creative Commons Share-alike license. It was made available on the iPhone in one of the first ebook readers for that platform, and later made available via Amazon.com.

In 2010 Hacking Work was released; a business book focusing on how employees could break rules ("Hack") to empower themselves and their company. The book was featured in several business journals such as the Harvard Business Review and resulted in a number of related guest posts on notable blogs such as Fast Company and BoingBoing.net.

Klein's You Are the Product: How to Survive-and Thrive-in the Era of Reputation Economics was published in 2015. The book describes how we've moved from finance to reputation through the rise of social software and emerging technologies, and was featured in numerous business journals such as Fortune and 
Inc, as well as blogs such as 
the Huffington Post and 
The Wall Street Journal's MarketWatch. The book was also featured on radio outlets such as NPR and KUOW.

Crows

In 2008 Klein displayed his thesis project at New York University's ITP program. This thesis posited that synanthropic species (those that have adapted to living near or in human habitats) could be trained to contribute something useful through interaction with new systems as opposed to acting as parasites in a human environment. The demonstration of this was a device which dispensed peanuts and coins in a series of steps designed to teach the crows to drop coins into a slot in exchange for a peanut. Klein later spoke about this project at the TED conference and referenced the concept of synanthropy in his Make Magazine article on training your cat to use the toilet.

The authenticity of his thesis and claims made during a December 2008 interview with a New York Times reporter (and, by implication, his TED talk) were called into question by the publication of a correction by the paper April 2009. The correction stated the experiments never succeeded in teaching the crows to drop the coins into the slot. Klein issued a response to this correction on his website, in which he claims The Times damaged the overall project.

Hacking

Klein's speeches and articles frequently center on hacking as a theme, in which he reappropriates the term from its common misconception (as executing malicious computer attacks) to instead emphasize the unorthodox reworking of existing systems (systems thinking) for mutual benefit. This theme is elaborated on in his speeches to explain how he was able to achieve exploits such as publishing a book by giving it away for free, training crows to fetch coins, and reworking the employee/employer relationship.

References

External links
 
 
 
 
 
 
 
 "What It Is".  Tod N. Juden Vanity Flair August–September 2015 Issue #88. Retrieved 2015-11-04.
 

1974 births
Living people
People from Seattle
Fellows of the American Physical Society